Tianjin University (TJU), formerly Peiyang University, is a national public research university in Tianjin, China. The university was established in 1895 by Guangxu Emperor's royal charter to be the first university of China. It is now funded by the Ministry of Education of China, while being a member of the national Double First Class University Plan, Project 985, and Project 211.

The university was established in 1895 as Imperial Tientsin University and later Peiyang University. In 1951, after restructuring, it was renamed Tianjin University, and became one of the largest multidisciplinary engineering universities in China, one of the first 16 national key universities accredited by the nation in 1959. It is now among the first group of institutions of higher learning to be included in the national "Double First Class University Plan" and former ministerial "Project 211" and "Project 985" by which it is given priority in construction. In order to carry out the "21st Century Education Revitalizing Action Plan", in late 2000 the Ministry of Education and Tianjin Municipality signed an agreement intending to build Tianjin University into a world-class university for the 21st century, including setting up the Excellence League.

History

In 1895, Sheng Xuanhuai submitted his memorial to the Guangxu Emperor to request for approval to set up a modern higher education institution in Tianjin. After approval on October 2, 1895, Peiyang Western Study College was founded by him and American educator Charles Daniel Tenney and later developed to Peiyang University. It was the first university providing four year degree modern higher education in China. The university modeled itself on the famous American Universities and aimed to rejuvenate China by training qualified personnel with new scientific and technological knowledge. After the PR China's foundation and university restructures, Peiyang University was renamed Tianjin University in 1951.

Peiyang University / Tianjin University contributes greatly to the Chinese society. In its early days, undergraduates had the permission to directly pursue graduate study at Harvard and Yale without any entrance exams. Its Law School, which is the first (and also the best at that time) Law School in China, was merged into Peking University and gave Peking University a fresh new start. Peiyang's Department of Aeronautics was separated and developed into Beihang University.

Timeline 
1895 Peiyang University founded
1900 The first modern diploma in China granted
1907 Developed into a comprehensive university integrating Engineering with Liberal Arts, Law and Education.
1935 The first group of graduate students enrolled
1937 The first master's degree conferred
1951 Merged with Hebei Institute of Technology, renamed as Tianjin University
1958 The first library (floor area of 14423 m2) established
1959 Became one of the first 16 National Key Universities
1981 The first group of PhD students enrolled
1984 The graduate school founded
1985 The first doctor's degree conferred
1995 100th anniversary
1999 National University Science Park built to facilitate knowledge transfer
2000 Became one of the first batch of universities under “985” Project
2009 Bachelor of Engineering (BEng) degree program in Chemical Engineering accredited by IchemE (Institution of Chemical Engineers)
2010 Tianjin University New Campus Plan Launched
2013 Tianjin Co-Innovation Center of Chemical Science and Engineering (COIC_CSE) became one of the first 14 collaborative innovation centers of the "2011" Project
2015 120th anniversary and new campus(Peyang Yuan) completed
2017 Listed by "the World First Class University and First Class Academic Discipline Construction"
2021 Listed by "the World First Class University and First Class Academic Discipline Construction" again

Building of disciplines

A discipline layout, with stress on engineering, incorporating science, engineering, economics, management, humanities, education, law and art has been formed in the university. The university now has 6 national key disciplines and 17 municipal key disciplines. Some disciplines with advantages and characteristics such as power machinery and engineering, optical engineering, testing and measuring technology and instruments, chemical engineering, chemical technology, management science and engineering, mechanics, architecture, material science and engineering, are all leading disciplines in China and have international influence.

For the time being, the university has 12 first-grade disciplines and 49 second-grade disciplines that confer Doctoral degree, 87 disciplines conferring master's degree, 17 engineering disciplines conferring master's degree in engineering. The university also confers master's degrees in business administration (MBA) and public administration (MPA). At present there are 15 postdoctoral research programs, 4 national key laboratories, 1 national engineering research center, 2 technology research and promotion centers of national scientific and technological achievements, 7 engineering technological R&D centers and open laboratories at ministerial level.

In June 2001, the university was evaluated by the expert panel of the Ministry of Education as having successfully completed all the construction items set by “211-Project” for the Ninth Five-Year Plan Period.

Scientific and technological achievements

The university boasts a strong team of professional and concurrent researchers. There are five key national laboratories, one national engineering research center, two national promotion centers for scientific and technological achievements, seven engineering research and development centers and open laboratories at ministerial level. There are over 80 laboratories, 110 research institutes, 15 experimental research and engineering development centers at the university.

Since the policy of reform and opening up to the outside world, hundreds of scientific and technological achievements of the university have won prizes. Among them, 70 won the National Natural Science Award, the National Invention Award, or the Award of National Science and Technology Progress, and 510 won the awards of science and technology progress of the Ministry of Education or at provincial or ministerial level. 393 have applied for patents, of which 278 have been patented. In 2001, the Science and Technology Park of Tianjin University became one of the 22 university sci-tech parks in China. A scientific research system consisting of basic research, applied research and R&D has been formed at the university. The university's annual amount of financial aid received from the National Natural Science Foundation always ranks top among China's engineering institutions of higher learning. Great achievements have been made in transforming scientific and technological achievements into productive forces. The university has established extensive cooperative relations with many large and medium-sized enterprises at home. In 2000 the university's funds for science and technology amounted to RMB 280 million.

Since the 1980s, hundreds of scientific and technological achievements of the university have won prizes. During the Ninth Five-Year Plan period, 159 scientific and technological achievements of the university won prizes. Among them, six are the National Invention Award, nine the Award of National Science and Technology Progress, one the National Natural Science Foundation Award, 56 the Science and Technology Progress Prize of the Ministry of Education, 81 the Science and Technology Progress Award of Tianjin City, 22 other provincial or ministerial Science and Technology Progress prizes. 134 achievements were patented, in which 35 were inventions and 99 practical new-type patents.

During the Ninth Five-Year Plan period, the university's scientific research funds amount to RMB 1.055 billion, a record high in the university's history, and come out front among universities nationwide. In October 1999, Tianjin University, in cooperation with Tianjin Economic and Development Area, established the University Sci-tech Park. The park, evaluated by the Ministry of Science and Technology and the Ministry of Education, has been named as a trial national university park for science and technology.

In recent years, its students have won more than 100 prizes in competitions on different subjects, of which four are international prizes, 50 are national prizes. In the International architectural design competition for University Students held in 1994 and 2000, participated by over 180 colleges and universities from more than 50 countries including world-famous universities like MIT, Harvard and Cambridge University, the participants from the School of Architecture of Tianjin University won twice the highest prize which indicates the university's educational quality and level.

High-tech industries
The university industries are characterized by bringing forth new ideas to technology, initiating high-tech enterprises, and transforming scientific and technological achievements into industries. Tiancai Co. Ltd. is the representative of the university's industries, which takes advantage of the university's superiority in science and technology. The university's industries include computer information, packed towers, industrial crystallization, and opto-electronic integration and have made good economic as well as social benefits.

In 2020 professor Zhang Hao (張浩) was convicted in the US on charges of stealing trade secrets on behalf of his firm and Tianjin University. The stolen trade secrets allowed his company and Tianjin to unfairly compete in the global radio frequency filter market. In 2009 Zhang Hao and his accomplice  Pang Wei (龐慰) who were both professors at Tianjin University cooperated with the university to found a company named Novana using the stolen information.

Campus culture

Tianjin University has formed a rich campus cultural atmosphere by promoting its education in ideology, politics, science and technology, culture and art. In recent years, the university has attached great importance to quality education of its students. The Students’ Union, the Students’ Scientific Society, Peiyang Art Team, and the Youth Volunteers’ Society have played active roles in organizing cultural and art festivals, science and technology festivals, sport festivals, work-study programs, and social activities in the forms of lectures, seminars, contests, soliciting articles, training and weekend music parties. The university, as a trial unit and base of national cultural quality education for undergraduates, has made remarkable achievements in cultural quality education. In 2000, Vice Premier Li Lanqing made important comments on the art education report submitted to the Ministry of Education by Tianjin University, making Tianjin University's art education model one of the three in China. Tianjin University was chosen as a National Advanced Unit of Art education.

Rankings and reputation 

In the 2022 US News & World Report Best Global University Ranking, a number of disciplines and subjects at Tianjin University are ranked in the global top 300th including:
Polymer Science #9
Energy and Fuels #14
Nanoscience and Nanotechnology #14
Chemical Engineering #15
Physical Chemistry #17
Mechanical Engineering #20
Condensed Matter Physics #20
Chemistry #23
Civil Engineering #36
Engineering #38
Materials Science #45
Electrical and Electronic Engineering #48
Optics  #53
Biotechnology and Applied Microbiology #69
Computer Science #129
Mathematics #223
Environment/Ecology  #230
Biology and Biochemistry #273
Geosciences #302

Cooperation and exchanges

Tianjin University was one of the first universities in China to explore cooperation with external organizations, and conducts extensive international exchanges and cooperation, keeping close relations with many institutions of higher learning, educational institutions, and transnational enterprises worldwide. The university has established cooperative relations with provinces and cities such as Hebei Province, Jilin Province, Xinjiang, Tibet, and Chongqing Municipality. Its scientific and technological cooperation can be found all over the country. The university strengthens its cooperation with transnational industrial groups in the high-tech fields. Meanwhile, the university has signed cooperation agreements with more than 20 transnational companies, and with 80 institutions of higher learning from 28 countries, conducting academic exchanges, cooperative scientific research and joint training programs.

The university invites famous scholars and celebrities to be its honorary or guest professors. To name a few, Prof. Herbert A. Simon, Nobel Prize winner of the Psychology Department of Carnegie Mellon University; Professor Gerald Vizenor, Emeritus professor of American literature at the University of New Mexico (Vizenor portrayed Tianjin University in his novel Griever: An American Monkey King in China); Dr. Yang Zhenning, famous physicist of the State University of New York; academician, world-famous mathematician Lin Jiaqiao; Mazuopin Kalin, professor of the Electrical Machinery Department of Yale University; Li Dingyi, professor of AT&T Bell Laboratory. In recent years, the university has sponsored or undertaken more than a dozen large international academic conferences, which create more channels for the university to promote international exchanges and cooperation.

Tianjin University also cooperated with University of South Australia to build China-Australia Centre for Sustainable Urban Development at October 27, 2012.

Notable alumni

 Wang Ch'ung-hui, jurist, diplomat and politician
 Tang Shaoyi, assassinated statesman
 Ma Yinchu, economist
 Shu-tian Li, engineer and president of Peiyang
 Xu Zhimo, poet
 Jinlong Gong, chemist and professor
 Zhang Tailei, leader of the Guangzhou Uprising
 Chen Lifu, bureaucrat, politician, and anti-communist
 Wang Zhengting, diplomat
 Huang Jiqing, geologist
 Jia Qinglin, retired senior leader of the People's Republic of China and of its ruling Communist Party
 Larry Yung, former chairman of CITIC Pacific
 Sun Guangxin, billionaire businessman
 XinMo Li, contemporary artist
Feigang Fei, restaurateur

Notable faculty 

 Hou Debang, chemical engineering expert
 Mao Yisheng, structural engineering expert
 William S.W. Lim, architect
 Feng Jicai, writer

See also 
 Asteroid 8917 Tianjindaxue, named for the Tianjin University
 President of Tianjin University

References

External links 
 Official Website

 
Universities and colleges in Tianjin
Project 211
Project 985
1895 establishments in China
Educational institutions established in 1895
Vice-ministerial universities in China
Major National Historical and Cultural Sites in Tianjin